Baba Kamal (also Romanized as Bābā Kamāl) is a village in Ahmadabad Rural District, in the Central District of Firuzabad County, Fars Province, Iran. At the 2006 census, its population was 147, in 31 families, meaning that the average family size in Bama Kamal is 4.74.

References 

Populated places in Firuzabad County